Evan Cochrane (born 13 December 1972) is an Australian former professional rugby league footballer who played as a er and  in the 1990s.

He played for the Western Suburbs Magpies in 1992, the South Sydney Rabbitohs in 1993, the Balmain Tigers in 1995, the London Broncos in 1996 and finally the Newcastle Knights from 1997 to 1998.

References

1972 births
Living people
Australian rugby league players
Western Suburbs Magpies players
South Sydney Rabbitohs players
Balmain Tigers players
London Broncos players
Newcastle Knights players
Rugby league centres
Rugby league wingers
Place of birth missing (living people)